Nadia Zyncenko (born 1 April 1948) is an Argentine weather forecaster and meteorologist of Italian birth and Ukrainian descent.

Biography
Nadia Zyncenko is the daughter of Vladímir Zyncenko, a Ukrainian veteran of the Red Army in World War II, and the Ukrainian María Petrenko (born 1924). After the war her parents met in Rome and went to live in Bagnoli (then a coastal village 5 km from Naples, now a neighborhood in the west of the city), where Nadia was born.

She grew up with her parents in a rural area of Pilar, Buenos Aires Province, 40 km from the city of Buenos Aires. There her two brothers, Pablo and Pedro, were born.

Professional career
Zyncenko entered the Faculty of Exact and Natural Sciences at the University of Buenos Aires, where she obtained a scholarship from the National Meteorological Service, a state agency that at that time was dependent on the Argentine Air Force. She is an active member of the International Organization of Weather Presenters.

In 1980 she earned a spot as a substitute "weather presenter" on Televisión Pública Argentina (Canal 7), the state television station. She later got a permanent job on Buenos Aires' Canal 11 (now Telefe). In 1992, she became once again "the weather woman" on the state channel, this time permanently, appearing from Monday to Friday at noon and 9:00p.m., and on Sundays at midnight. Meanwhile, she kept her job at the National Meteorological Service (with the position "chief of aeronautical meteorology" at Jorge Newbery airport, among others), until 2010.

On Monday, 4 June 2012, she started her own half-hour television program, Nadia 6:30, on Televisión Pública Argentina.

On 18 May 2014 she received a special career recognition at the Martín Fierro Awards.

On 6 February 2018, Zyncenko was separated from Televisión Pública, apparently for having exceeded – at 69 – the retirement age. Despite this, on 8 February 2018, the government extended retirement until age 70 for men and women.

Notes

References

External links

 

1948 births
Argentine meteorologists
Argentine people of Ukrainian descent
Italian emigrants to Argentina
Living people
People from Buenos Aires
Television meteorologists
Argentine women television presenters
University of Buenos Aires alumni
Women meteorologists
Italian people of Ukrainian descent